Cleome tetrandra is a species of plant in the Cleomaceae family and is found in Western Australia.

It blooms between January and July producing yellow flowers.

It is found along creeks and amongst sandstone outcrops on ridges throughout much of the Kimberley region of Western Australia growing in sandy soils.

References

tetrandra
Plants described in 1824
Flora of Western Australia